UniCOB simply written as Unicob is a Sri Lankan 4x4  Mine-Resistant Ambush Protected (MRAP) Infantry mobility vehicle produced by the Sri Lanka Electrical and Mechanical Engineers.

History
Unicob began manufacturing in 2021 and was first publicly unveiled in February 2022 during Independence Day celebrations. 

Initially, it is planned to produce ten units. But a demand for around fifty vehicles is expected.

Design
The Unicob is a 4x4 vehicle with a capacity for 9 including driver, gunner and commander designed to withstand mines and small arms fire. Units are equipped with an all direction surveillance system and field to command real-time communication and monitoring capability as well as a fully air conditioned crew cabin. As it is designed to make use of locally available spare parts, it has much lower production and maintenance costs compared to imported equivalents. 

It is armed with a turret for a 12.7mm machine gun.  The vehicle is capable of handling disaster relief and MEDEVAC operations.

References

Wheeled armoured personnel carriers
Post–Cold War military equipment of Sri Lanka
Military vehicles introduced in the 2020s
Vehicles of Sri Lanka
Armoured personnel carriers of the post–Cold War period